Granger Kent Costikyan (29 March 1907 – 10 March 1998) was an American banker. Granger was educated at Hotchkiss School, graduating in 1925, and Yale University, graduating in 1929. He was a member of the Skull and Bones secret society.

Costikyan was with the New York Trust Company from 1929 to 1959, and became a partner of Brown Brothers Harriman in 1969. He was Vice President of the Chemical Bank of New York, from 1959 to 1962; and Senior Vice President of the First Bank Stock Corporation of Minneapolis, from 1962 to 1969. Costikyan also served as Chairman of the First Bank System of Minneapolis.

References

1907 births
1998 deaths
American bankers
Yale University alumni
20th-century American businesspeople
Hotchkiss School alumni